Carroll Reed (1905–1995) was a ski instructor and promoter of the sport of skiing in New Hampshire, United States.
 He was the developer of the Eastern Slope Ski School and among the developers of the Cranmore Mountain Resort in North Conway, New Hampshire.

References 

1905 births
1995 deaths
People from Massachusetts